.limbo messiah is a 2007 album by rock-punk band Beatsteaks. The album reached the European Top 100 Albums charts.

Track list
All tracks composed by Beatsteaks.
 "As I Please" – 2:35
 "Jane Became Insane" – 2:45
 "Sharp, Cool & Collected" – 2:12
 "Meantime" – 2:30
 "Demons Galore" – 2:51
 "Cut Off the Top" – 3:13
 "Bad Brain" – 2:38
 "She Was Great" – 2:46
 "Soljanka" – 3:54
 "Hail to the Freaks" – 3:13
 "E-G-O" – 2:43

Personnel
Arnim Teutoburg-Weiß – lead vocals
Bernd Kurtzke – guitar, background vocals
Peter Baumann – bass, guitar, background vocals
Torsten Scholz – bass
Thomas Götz – drums
Arne Denneler – production assistant, editing
Andi "The Dog" Jung – mixing
Moses Schneider – producer, engineer, mixing

Charts

Weekly charts

Year-end charts

References

External links

Beatsteaks albums
2007 albums
Warner Music Group albums